Flute 'n the Blues is an album by saxophonist James Moody recorded in 1956 and released on the Argo label. The album was Moody's first recording featuring him on flute.

Reception

Scott Yanow, writing for AllMusic, stated: "The basic material (mostly standards and blues) are given spirited and swinging treatment by the underrated group".

Track listing 
 "Flute 'n the Blues" (Harold Newboldt, James Moody, Arthur Boyd) - 4:06   
 "Birdland Story" (Eddie Jefferson, Moody) - 2:29   
 "It Could Happen to You" (Jimmy Van Heusen, Johnny Burke) -  2:40   
 "I Cover the Waterfront" (Edward Heyman, Johnny Green) - 2:40   
 "Body and Soul" (Heyman, Green, Robert Sour, Frank Eyton) - 4:23
 "Breaking the Blues" (John Adriano Acea) - 4:07   
 "Parker's Mood" (Charlie Parker) - 3:20   
 "Easy Living" (Leo Robin, Ralph Rainger) - 3:52   
 "Boo's Tune" (Florence Pleasant) - 3:42   
 "Richard's Blues" (Moody, Newboldt) - 4:37

Personnel 
James Moody - tenor saxophone, alto saxophone, flute
Johnny Coles - trumpet - featured on track 8
William Shepherd - trombone - featured on track 3
Pee Wee Moore - baritone saxophone 
Jimmy Boyd - piano, peck horn
John Latham - bass
Clarence Johnston - drums
Eddie Jefferson - vocals (tracks 2, 4 & 7)

References 

James Moody (saxophonist) albums
1956 albums
Argo Records albums